The Cook Islands national rugby sevens team is a minor national sevens side. They qualified for the 2014 Hong Kong Sevens tournament and played in the World Series Qualifiers.

History 
Cook Islands lost to Papua New Guinea at the 2017 Oceania Sevens Championship which denied them a place at the Sydney and Hamilton legs of the World Series and also qualification for the 2018 Commonwealth Games and Rugby World Cup Sevens.

Tournament history
The Cook Islands has not qualified for the Summer Olympics.

Rugby World Cup Sevens

Commonwealth Games

Players

Notable players

Koiatu Koiatu

See also
 Cook Islands national rugby union team (XV)
 Rugby union in the Cook Islands

References

sevens
National rugby sevens teams
Rugby union sevens, men